The 44th Antalya Golden Orange Film Festival  was held from October 19 to 28 2007 in Antalya, Turkey. Awards were presented in the 44th Antalya Golden Orange Festival in 20 categories of three competition divisions and in the 3rd Eurasia Film Festival in 4 categories. The award ceremony took place on October 28, 2007 at the Glass Pyramid Sabancı Congress and Exhibition Center in the downtown of Antalya. It was run in conjunction with the 3rd International Eurasia Film Festival.

Jury
Following cinema professionals formed the juries:

Antalya Golden Orange Film Festival

Feature film competition
 Genco Erkal, chairman
 Mehmet Açar
 Zeki Demirkubuz
 Mahinur Ergun
 Uğur İçbak
 Nida Karabol
 Hale Soygazi
 Cem Yılmaz
 Emrah Yücel

Documentary film competition
 Ertuğrul Karslıoğlu, chairman
 Tuba Akyol
 Coşkun Aral
 Canan Obay
 Ludmilla Cvikova

Short subject competition
 Semir Aslanyürek, chairman
 Ebru Ceylan
 Cansel Elçin
 Balçiçek Pamir
 Danny Lennon

Nominees

Antalya Golden Orange Film Festival

Following 12 national films (in alphabetical order) were nominated to compete for the Golden Orange Award:
 Adem'in Trenleri directed by Barış Pirhasan
 İyi Seneler Londra by Berkun Oya
 Janjan by Aydın Sayman
 Bliss by Abdullah Oğuz
 Mülteci by Reis Çelik
 Münferit by Dersu Yavuz Altun
 Rıza by Tayfun Pirselimoğlu
 Saklı Yüzler by Handan İpekçi
 Sis ve Gece by Turgut Yasalar
 The Edge of Heaven by Fatih Akın
 Egg by Semih Kaplanoğlu
 Zeynep's Eight Days by Cemal Şan

Awards

Antalya Golden Orange Film Festival

Feature film competition

Jury special awards

Documentary film competition

Short subject competition

NETPAC Jury Award

References

External links
 TURSAK 
 Tuba Akyol Milliyet

Golden orange
Golden Orange
Antalya Golden Orange Film Festival
A
21st century in Antalya